C29 or C-29 may refer to:

Vehicles 
Aircraft
 British Aerospace C-29, a military navigation trainer
 Caspar C 29, a German floatplane
 Cierva C.29, a British autogyro
 Douglas C-29 Dolphin, an American military amphibious flying boat
 Fiat C.29, an Italian racing seaplane

Automobiles
 Sauber C29, a Swiss Formula One car

Ships
 , a C-class submarine of the Royal Navy

Other uses 
 C29 road (Namibia)
 Caldwell 29, a spiral galaxy
 Middleton Municipal Airport, in Dane County, Wisconsin
 Vienna Gambit, a chess opening